The Gyeongnam Line (慶南線, Keinan-sen) was a railway line of the Chōsen Railway (Chōtetsu) of colonial-era Korea, located in South Gyeongsang Province.

History
On 13 July 1918, the privately owned Chōsen Southern Railway was granted a concession to build a railway line from Songjeongni (now Gwangju Songjeong) to Masan, but it wasn't until June 1922 that work on the first section, from Masan to Jinju, began. The line was not yet opened when the Chōsen Southern Railway merged with five other privately owned railways to create the Chōsen Railway on 1 September 1923; it was only three months after the merger, on 1 December 1923, that the first section,  from Masan to Gunbuk, was opened, under the name Gyeongnam Line. The remaining  section to Jinju was opened on 15 June 1925. On 1 April 1931, the state-owned Chōsen Government Railway bought the Gyeongnam Line, merging it with its own Masan Line to create the Gyeongjeon Nambu Line running from Samnangjin to Jinju.

Route

References

Rail transport in South Korea
Rail transport in Korea
Korea under Japanese rule
Defunct railway companies of Japan
Defunct railway companies of Korea
Chosen Railway